The Northern Riverina Football Netball League (NRFNL) is an Australian rules football and netball competition containing five clubs based in the northern Riverina region of New South Wales, Australia. The league features four grades in the Australian rules football competition, with these being Seniors, Under 17s, Under 14s and Under 11s. In the netball competition, there are five grades, with these being A-Grade, B-Grade, C-Grade, Under 16s and Under 13s.

History 

The Northern Riverina Football League was formed in May 1924 when the Ungarie Football Association amalgamated with the Lake Cargelligo Football Association to form the Northern Riverina Australian Rules Football Association.

The five foundation club's in 1924 were - Burgooney, Girral, Lake Callgelligo Rovers, Tullibigeal and Ungarie, with Girral defeating Ungarie in the grand final.

Blow Clear entered the competition in 1925, with Tullibigeal losing only one game for the year, but were defeated by Lake Callgelligo in the grand final.

Girral and Blow Clear merged in 1926 and went on to be the premier team. Following a split in the Tullibigeal club, Four Corners was formed in 1927 and went onto be a very competitive club right up until 1994, when they folded.

Calleen joined in 1928 and Four Corners won the premiership in only their second year in the NRFA. while in 1929 Weja joined the competition, which was divided into two divisions of four teams. Four Corners and Girral finishing on top of their divisions, with Four Corners coming out on top in the grand final.

Lake Callgelligo Rovers withdrew in 1930 and the competition went back to one division, with Four Corners defeating minor premiers, Ungarie in the grand final.

Calleen and Girral both withdrew in 1932 and Yelkin entered the competition, with minor premiers, Ungarie losing to Four Corners in the grand final.

Naradhan entered the NRFA in 1933 and Tullibigeal broke through for their first premiership with an eight point victory over Four Corners in the grand final.

Burgooney won the 1934 flag when they defeated Tullibigeal by points, then Burgooney lost the 1935 grand final when Ungarie's Les Woolsterncroft snapped a goal late in the last quarter, to defeat Burgooney by one point!

West Milby who joined in 1935 and Erigolia who joined in 1936, played off the 1936 grand final, with West Milby winning their one and only premiership. Girral withdrew form the NEFA half way through the 1936 season. 

In 1937, Lake Cargelligo re-join with a blue uniform and West Milby make the grand final from fourth position, but are defeated by Four Corners in the grand final.

Kikoria entered the NRFA in 1938 and Tullibigeal won the flag, after drawing the first semi final against West Milby. Burgooney, minor premiers in 1938, only lost one match throughout the year, then kicked 7.19 - 61 in the grand final to lose by 30 points.

Ungarie dropped out in 1939, there only season they did not field a team, with Burgooney defeating West Milby by three points in the grand final.

Kikoria won the premiership in 1940, and also won it again in 1941, after Four Corner went into recess and some of their players moved across to play with Kikoria's premiership team of 1941.

The NRFA went into recess from 1942 to 1945 due to World War Two. Tullibigeal then won three consecutive premierships immediately after the war from 1946 to 1948, under the leadership of George Imrie.

In 1947, Ungarie wore a white jumper with a red sash. 

In 1949, the NRFA, best and fairest player was awarded the Griffith P. Evans Cup, Griff Evans was a former West Wyalong player and official and also a local solicitor and NSW State Member for Lachlan, whose family donated the cup.

Rankins Springs and West Wyalong boosted the competition to seven teams when they joined in 1949, but Forrest Vale withdrew. 

In 1950, Lake Cargelligo returned to the NRFA and Ungarie won their first premiership since 1935, led by former Forrest Vale captain, Jim Dale.

Tullibigeal had a golden era in the 1950's winning senior football premierships in 1951, 1953, 1955, 1957 and 1958 and well as three of their players winning best and fairest award, the Evans Cup in - David Imrie, Kelth Imrie and Vince Dwyer.

Footballers from the NRFL who have played in the VFL/AFL include the Daniher brothers (Terry, Neale, Anthony and Chris) and Ben Fixter.

Pre 1924 Football
Australian Rules Football was introduced to the Northern Riverina region around in the early 1890's when farm land was being settled and with the discovery of gold at West Wyalong in 1893.

West Wyalong formed a club in 1913, consisting of two teams, the Rovers (maroon & gold) and the Globes (blue), then in 1914, a competition was held between Blow Clear, Hiawatha and West Wyalong. Ungarie was formed in 1916 and played three friendly matches against Blow Clear in their first season.

After World War One, the Bolygamy District Football Association was formed and Australian Rules Football was really starting to get established in the Northern Riverina area. Lake Cargelligo Rovers Football Club was formed in June 1922.

Premiers / Runners Up
Nottle Cup
1913: West Wyalong Globes: 1.4 - 10 d West Wyalong Rovers: 1.1 - 7

Evans Cup
1914: Hiawatha: 3.13 - 31 d Blow Clear: 0.4 - 4

Football in recess due to World War One
1915 to 1917

Bolygamy District Football Association: Hodges Cup
1918: Blow Clear: 5.9 - 39 d West Wyalong: 2.11 - 23 (Hodges Cup)
1919: Blow Clear: 5.6 - 36 d Bolygamy: 3.7 - 25 (Hodges Cup)
1920: Blow Clear: d Girral
1921: Girral v Tullibigeal: F J Rath's Ungarie Hotel Cup
1922: Girral Rovers: 6.3 - 39 d Tullibigeal: 4.10 - 34 (Mesdame Wallder - Farrar Cup)

Ungarie Football Association
1923: Ungarie: 35 d Blow Clear: 0.5 - 5 (J Heffernan - Girral Hotel Gold Medals)

Lake Cargelligo District Football Association (Tom Crawford's Royal Mail Hotel Cup)
1923: Lake Cargelligo Rovers: 5.4 - 34 d Tullibigeal Ramblers: 4.3 - 27

Current clubs

Notes

Previous clubs

List of football premiers

Football 
Senior Football Grand Final Results

Under 16s/17s 

1974: Ungarie
1975: Ungarie
1976: Ungarie
1977: Ungarie
1978: Ungarie
1979: Condobolin-Milby
1980: Lake Cargelligo
1981: Ungarie
1982: Ungarie
1983: Condobolin-Milby
1984: Condobolin-Milby
1985: Tullibigeal
1986: Ungarie
1987: Ungarie
1988: Lake Cargelligo
1989: Lake Cargelligo
1990: Ungarie
1991: Ungarie
1992: Ungarie
1993: Lake Cargelligo

1994: Lake Cargelligo
1995: Ungarie
1996: Ungarie
1997: Lake Cargelligo
1998: Lake Cargelligo
1999: Lake Cargelligo
2000: Tullibigeal
2001: Tullibigeal
2002: Tullibigeal
2003: Tullibigeal
2004: West Wyalong-Girral
2005: Parkes
2006: West Wyalong-Girral
2007: West Wyalong-Girral
2008: West Wyalong-Girral
2009: Ungarie
2010: Lake Cargelligo
2011: Lake Cargelligo
2012: West Wyalong-Girral

2013: Lake Cargelligo: 16.14 - 110 d West Wyalong-Girral: 7.8 - 50
2014: Lake Cargelligo: 11.8 - 74 d West Wyalong-Girral: 7.6 - 48
2015: West Wyalong-Girral: 18.10 - 118 d Lake Cargelligo: 6.5 - 41
2016: Lake Cargelligo: 13.6 - 84 d West Wyalong-Girral: 4.5 - 29
2017: Lake Cargelligo: 16.10 - 106 d West Wyalong-Girral: 6.4 - 40
2018: West Wyalong-Girral: 13.13 - 91 d Ungarie: 3.3 - 21
2019: West Wyalong-Girral: 18.15 - 123 d Ungarie: 4.7 - 31
2020: NRFNL in recess > COVID-19
2021: Tullibigeal v Hillston (no grand final played > COVID-19)
2022: West Wyalong-Girral: 14.21 - 105 d Ungarie: 4.6 - 30

Under 13s/14s 

1981: Ungarie
1982: Ungarie
1983: Ungarie
1984: Condobolin-Milby
1985: Lake Cargelligo
1986: Lake Cargelligo
1987: Ungarie
1988: Ungarie
1989: Condobolin-Milby
1990: Lake Cargelligo
1991: Lake Cargelligo
1992: Ungarie
1993: Lake Cargelligo
1994: Ungarie

1995: Tullibigeal
1996: Tullibigeal
1997: Tullibigeal
1998: Tullibigeal
1999: Tullibigeal
2000: West Wyalong-Girral
2001: Ungarie
2002: West Wyalong-Girral
2003: West Wyalong-Girral
2004: Lake Cargelligo
2005: West Wyalong-Girral
2006: Ungarie
2007: Barellan United
2008: Barellan United

2009: Lake Cargelligo
2010: Tullibigeal
2011: Ungarie
2012: Lake Cargelligo: 
2013: Tullibigeal: 9.12 - 66 d Lake Cargelligo: 6.7 - 43
2014: Barellan United: 3.4 - 22 d Hillston: 1.3 - 9
2015: West Wyalong-Girral: 7.11 - 53 d Ungarie: 2.4 - 16
2016: Ungarie: 4.7 - 31 d Lake Cargelligo: 4.6 - 30
2017: West Wyalong-Girral: 8.14 - 62 d Ungarie: 1.3 - 9
2018: Tullibigeal: 7.5 - 47 d Lake Cargelligo: 4.7 - 31
2019: West Wyalong-Girral: 10.13 - 73 d Hillston: 1.0 - 6
2020: NRFNL in recess > COVID-19
2021: Ungarie v Lake Cargelligo (No grand final played > COVID-19)
2022: West Wyalong-Girral: 14.7 - 91 d Ungarie: 3.5 - 23

Under 11s/12s 

2002: Ungarie
2003: West Wyalong-Girral
2004: Barellan United
2005: Barellan United
2006: Barellan United
2007: Lake Cargelligo
2008: Barellan United

2009: Ungarie
2010: Lake Cargelligo
2011: Lake Cargelligo
2012: West Wyalong-Girral
2013: Hillston: 9.6 - 60 d West Wyalong-Girral: 2.5 - 17
2014: West Wyalong-Girral: 6.2 - 38 d Hillston: 3.7 - 25
2015: Hillston: 3.8 - 26 d West Wyalong-Girral: 3.4 - 22

2016: Ungarie: 3.4 - 22 d West Wyalong-Girral: 3.3 - 21
2017: Ungarie: 6.3 - 39 d West Wyalong-Girral: 2.9 - 21
2018: Lake Cargelligo: 7.7 - 49 d Ungarie: 4.2 - 26
2019: West Wyalong-Girral: 9.4 - 58 d Lake Cargelligo: 2.2 - 14
2020: NRFNL in recess > COVID-19
2021: Lake Cargelligo v West Wyalong-Girral (no grand final played > COVID-19)
2022: Lake Cargelligo: 5.3 - 33 d Hillston: 2.3 - 15

Netball Premiers
The NRNL - A. Grade competition commenced in 1981, with the Under 16's commencing in 1982, which was then dissolved in 1985. In 1984/85 the Under 13's started playing socially, then competitively. B. Grade commenced in 1988 and the Under 10's commenced in 1993. C Grade commenced in 2008, while in 2012 the Under 16's and Under 13's replaced the Under 14's and Under 12's competitions.

A-Grade 
1981 to present day

1981: Lake Tigers
1982: Tullibigeal
1983: Lake Tigers
1984: Lake Swans
1985: Tullibigeal
1986: West Wyalong-Girral
1987: Lake Cargelligo
1988: Lake Tigers
1989: Lake Tigers
1990: Lake Tigers
1991: Condo - Milby
1992: Condo - Milby
1993: Ungarie
1994: Barellan United
1995: Barellan United

1996: Barellan United
1997: Ungarie
1998: Ungarie
1999: Ungarie
2000: Ungarie
2001: Ungarie
2002: Lake Cargelligo
2003: Barellan United
2004: Tullibigeal
2005: Ungarie
2006: Ungarie
2007: Ungarie
2008: Ungarie
2009: Ungarie
2010: West Wyalong-Girral

2011: Barellan United
2012: West Wyalong-Girral
2013: Ungarie
2014: Ungarie
2015: West Wyalong-Girral
2016: Tullibigeal: 65 d West Wyalong Girral: 63
2017: Tullibigeal d West Wyalong Girral
2018: West Wyalong-Girral
2019: Tullibigeal: 51 d Hillston: 48
2020: NRFNL in recess > COVID-19
2021: Tullibigeal v West Wyalong Girral (no G Final played > COVID-19)
2022: Hillston: 58 d West Wyalong-Girral: 38
2023:

B-Grade 
1987 to present day

1987: Condo-Milby/Ungarie
1988: Lake Tigers
1989: Lake Tigers
1990: Lake Tigers
1991: Lake Tigers
1992: Four Corners
1993: Lake Cargelligo
1994: Tullibigeal
1995: Ungarie
1996: Barellan United
1997: Tullibigeal
1998: Barellan United
1999: Lake Cargelligo

2000: Ungarie
2001: Lake Cargelligo
2002: Barellan United
2003: Lake Cargelligo
2004: Barellan United
2005: Lake Cargelligo
2006: Barellan United
2007: Barellan United
2008: Lake Cargelligo
2009: Cobar
2010: West Wyalong-Girral
2011: Barellan United
2012: West Wyalong-Girral

2013: Barellan United
2014: West Wyalong-Girral
2015: Lake Cargelligo
2016: Tullibigeal: 47 d West Wyalong Girral: 41
2017: Ungarie d Hillston
2018: Lake Cargelligo
2019: West Wyalong Girral: 41 d Lake Cargelligo: 27
2020: NRFNL in recess > COVID-19
2021: Ungarie v Lake Cargelligo (no G Final played > COVID-19)
2022: Lake Cargelligo: 59 d Hillston: 34
2023:

C-Grade 
2008 to present day

2008: Lake Cargelligo
2009: West Wyalong-Girral
2010: Lake Cargelligo
2011: Hillston
2012: Lake Cargelligo
2013: Tullibigeal

2014: West Wyalong-Girral
2015: Hillston
2016: Lake Cargelligo: 52 d Condo Milby: 39
2017: West Wyalong Girral d Tullibigeal
2018: Tullibigeal
2019: West Wyalong Girral: 58 d Hillston: 35

2020: NRFNL in recess > COVID-19
2021: Lake Cargelligo v West Wyalong Girral (no G Final played > COVID-19)
2022: Ungarie: 49 d Hillston: 33
2023:

C-Reserve Grade 
2018 to present day

2018: West Wyalong Girral
2019: West Wyalong Girral: 40 d Tullibigeal: 31
2020: NRFNL in recess > COVID-19
2021: West Wyalong Girral v Ungarie (no G Final played > COVID-19)
2022: West Wyalong Girral: 61 d Ungarie: 49
2023:

Under 16s 
Under 16 - 2012 to present day

2012: Lake Cargelligo
2013: Tullibigeal
2014:
2015: 
2016: Lake Cargelligo: 43 d Condo Milby: 37

2017: Condo-Milby V Tullibigeal
2018:
2019: Ungarie: 54 d Lake Cargelligo: 41
2020: NRFNL in recess > COVID-19
2021: West Wyalong Girral v Hillston (no G Final played > COVID-19)

2022: West Wyalong Girral: 47 d Lake Cargelligo: 33
2023:

Under 14s 
U/14's - ? to 2011

1998: Ungarie
1999: Barellan United
2000: Barellan United
2001: West Wyalong-Girral 
2002: Lake Cargelligo

2003: West Wyalong-Girral
2004: Barellan United
2005: Lake Cargelligo
2006: Lake Cargelligo
2007: Lake Cargelligo

2008: West Wyalong-Girral
2009: West Wyalong-Girral
2010: Lake Cargelligo
2011: Lake Cargelligo

Under 13s 
U/13's - 1985 to ? then, 2012 to present day

2012: Tullibigeal
2013: Lake Cargelligo
2014:
2015: 
2016: Lake Cargelligo 32 def Unagire 30

2017: Ungarie V West Wyalong Girral
2018:
2019: Hillston: 41 d Lake Cargelligo: 40
2020: NRFNL in recess > COVID-19
2021: Ungarie v Tullibigeal (no G Final played > COVID-19)

2022: Ungarie: 50 d Tullibigeal: 30
2023:

Under 12s 
U/12's - ? to 2011

2004: Lake Cargelligo
2005: Lake Cargelligo
2006: West Wyalong-Girral

2007: West Wyalong-Girral
2008: West Wyalong-Girral
2009: Lake Cargelligo\

2010: West Wyalong-Girral
2011: Tullibigeal

Under 10's 
1993 to ?

1993:
1994:

League Best & Fairest Winners
Senior Football
Griffith P. Evans Cup
First awarded in 1949. Now awarded the Evans Medal.

Junior Football - Best & Fairest Winners

Netball Best & Fairest Winners List
 A. Grade: 1981 to present day
 B. Grade: 1987 to present day
 C. Grade: 2008 to present day
 C. Reserve: 2018 to present day

Leading Goalkicker
Senior Football
Sanson Trophy

VFL / AFL Players

The following footballers played senior VFL / AFL football, with the year indicating their VFL / AFL debut.
1976 - Terry Daniher - Ungarie to South Melbourne
1979 - Neale Daniher - Ungarie to Essendon
1981 - Anthony Daniher - Ungarie to South Melbourne
1987 - Chris Daniher - Ungarie to Essendon
2000 - Ben Fixter - Ungarie to Sydney Swans

Office Bearers

See also
AFL NSW/ACT
List of Australian rules football clubs in Australia
Australian rules football in New South Wales
Albury & District Football League
Central Hume Football Association
Central Riverina Football League
Coreen & District Football League
Farrer Football League
Faithful & District Football Association
Hume Football Netball League
Riverina Football Association
Riverina Football Netball League
South West Football League (New South Wales)
Central West Australian Football League
Group 20 Rugby League
Group 17 Rugby League

References

External links
 

Australian rules football competitions in New South Wales
Sport in the Riverina
Netball leagues in New South Wales